The 1980–81 Iraqi National Clubs First Division was the 7th season of the competition since its foundation in 1974. The competition was originally meant to be held in a double round-robin format, but was later changed to a single round-robin tournament due to the Iran–Iraq War. Al-Talaba won the league title for the first time in their history.

Holders Al-Shorta defeated Al-Zawraa 3–0 on the final day of the season on 19 May to move on equal points and equal goal difference with Al-Talaba. Although Al-Shorta had scored two more goals than Al-Talaba, the Iraq Football Association decided that teams who were equal on points and goal difference would be separated by number of wins and therefore Al-Talaba were crowned champions.

League table

Results

Season statistics

Top scorers

Hat-tricks

Notes
4 Player scored 4 goals

References

External links
 Iraq Football Association

Iraqi Premier League seasons
1980–81 in Iraqi football
Iraq